Echo II or Echo 2 or variant, may refer to:

 Echo II-class submarine of the Soviet Navy
 Echo 2 (satellite), a 1964 NASA communications satellite
 Echo II (expansion card), a speech synthesizer card for the Apple II

See also
 EchoStar II, a 1990s communications satellite
 Echo (disambiguation)